"Swagger Jagger" is the debut single by English singer Cher Lloyd, taken from her debut studio album Sticks and Stones (2011). It was released as the album's lead single on 31 July 2011. The song was written by the two production teams The Runners and The Monarch with Lloyd, Autumn Rowe, Marcus Lomax and Clarence Coffee Jr. and is composed to the tune of "Oh My Darling, Clementine". The music video was released on 26 June 2011. It was also used in the movie Identity Thief with Melissa McCarthy.

Despite receiving negative reviews from music critics, the song debuted at number one on the UK Singles Chart, and at number two in Ireland, becoming her biggest hit to date in these countries. The Guardian chose the song as the best number one single of 2011,  along with the Official Charts listing the track as the 35th biggest song of the summer of 2011 in the UK.

Background
"Swagger Jagger" received its first airplay on 20 June 2011. The single was leaked onto the internet on June 15, but this version was later confirmed as only the demo of the track on Lloyd's Twitter account. Lloyd performed the song on T4 on the Beach and also performed at the Leeds Aire FM Party in the Park and Key 103 Live Manchester, both on the day of release of "Swagger Jagger".

Critical reception
The song received mainly negative reviews from critics. Initial reviews compared the song to the Christmas carol "Little Donkey". However, in a positive review, Robert Copsey of Digital Spy gave the song four out of five stars. He noted similarities between the song's chorus and the American western folk ballad "Oh My Darling, Clementine", an opinion shared by users at "whosampled.com". In a negative review, Sabotage Times said of the "abominable" track: "Coming across like a sink estate answer to the Black Eyed Peas, the track combines a shouty, tuneless verse with a chorus that riffs on 'Oh My Darling Clementine'".

Chart performance
"Swagger Jagger" debuted at number one on the UK Singles Chart on 7 August 2011 ― for the week ending dated 13 August 2011. As of 12 August 2021, the single's sales have exceeded 300,000 copies in Britain. In Ireland, the single charted at number two on the Irish Singles Chart. The single debuted at number seventy-nine on the Mega Top 100 in the Netherlands. After a performance during the finals of So You Think You Can Dance, the song re-entered the chart at number sixty.

Track listing
UK digital EP
"Swagger Jagger" – 3:14
"Swagger Jagger" (Wideboys Radio Edit) – 3:03
"Swagger Jagger" (Dillon Francis Remix) – 5:06
"Swagger Jagger" (Eyes Remix) – 4:27

UK CD single
"Swagger Jagger" – 3:12
"Swagger Jagger" (HyGrade Pecan Pie Mix) – 3:35

US digital download
"Swagger Jagger" – 3:12

Credits and personnel 
Cher Lloyd – songwriter, vocals
Autumn Rowe – songwriter
The Runners (Andrew Harr and Jermaine Jackson) – songwriter, producer
The Monarch (Andre Davidson and Sean Davidson) – songwriter, co-producer
The Monsters & Strangerz (Marcus Lomax and Clarence Coffee Jr.) – songwriter
Jeff "Supa Jeff" Villanueva – engineer
Serban Ghenea – mixing
Alex Delicata – guitar
Tom Coyne – mastering

Source:

Charts

Certifications

Release history

References

Cher Lloyd songs
2011 debut singles
Number-one singles in Scotland
UK Singles Chart number-one singles
Songs written by Autumn Rowe
Songs written by Jermaine Jackson (hip hop producer)
Songs written by Andrew Harr
Song recordings produced by the Runners
Songs written by Marcus Lomax
2011 songs
Syco Music singles
Dance-pop songs
Songs written by Clarence Coffee Jr.
Songs written by Andre Davidson
Songs written by Sean Davidson
Song recordings produced by the Monarch (production team)